Lepidosperma filiforme, also known as the common rapier-sedge, is a sedge that occurs in coastal regions of south-eastern  Australia and New Zealand. Plants grow to between 0.3 and 1 metre high. The culms are smooth, rigid, terete and between 0.7 and 2 mm in diameter. The leaves are also terete and about 1 mm in diameter, with sheaths that are straw coloured or reddish.

The species was formally described in 1805 by French botanist Jacques Labillardière in 1805 based on plant material collected from Tasmania.

References

filiforme
Flora of New Zealand
Flora of New South Wales
Flora of Victoria (Australia)
Flora of Tasmania
Poales of Australia
Plants described in 1805
Taxa named by Jacques Labillardière